Anthony Bond (born 1888) was an English professional footballer who played as an outside right.

Career
Born in Preston, Bond played for Ashton Town, Bradford City and Lancaster Town. For Bradford City, he made 1 appearance in the Football League.

Sources

References

1888 births
Year of death missing
English footballers
Ashton Town A.F.C. players
Bradford City A.F.C. players
Footballers from Preston, Lancashire
Lancaster City F.C. players
English Football League players
Association football outside forwards